Wajir Airport is an international airport in Wajir County, Kenya.

Location
Wajir Airport  is located in Wajir town. Traditionally inhabited by ethnic Borana and later Somalis, the area lies near the Jubbada Hoose region of southern Somalia.

The geographical coordinates of this airport are: 1° 43' 48.00"N, 40° 5' 24.00"E (latitude:1.73000; longitude:40.09000).

History
The Wajir Airport was built by an Israeli construction Company HZ between 1977 and 1978, as a military airbase for the Kenya Air Force.

In November 2006, the Kenyan government decided to suspend direct scheduled flights to and from Somalia owing to security concerns vis-a-vis the then existing Islamic Courts Union. Following pressure by politically influential Somali traders to resume the cargo flights, the Kenya Civil Aviation Authority (KCAA) lifted its suspension a few months later in August 2007. It also indicated that all flights should thereafter stop at 
the Wajir Airport for customs, immigration and security screening before continuing onto their final destination. The Kenyan authorities subsequently outsourced the construction of a new terminal in the airport and assigned KCAA, customs, immigration and security officials to operate in the facility. On 7 September 2007 the Wajir Airport was commissioned to officially accommodate both passenger and military flights.

In 2012, US Navy Seabees built a new tarmac runway that can take heavy aircraft.

Facilities and staff
The airport has about 100 workers, mainly consisting of police officers. There are two military camps situated within the airport's limits. Security personnel guard the airport's only entrance to assure security.

Airlines and destinations
Wajir Airport handles about seven flights per day. As of September 2012, civil flights are offered twice a week by Echo. Most flights, however, are cargo. Some charter and military flights are additionally accommodated. As of August 2021, flights from Somalia have had to make a stop-over at Wajir Airport.

See also
 List of airports in Kenya

References

External links
 Security checks at Wajir airport for Mogadishu-Nairobi flights to stay As at 20 January 2017.
  Website of Kenya Airports Authority
 List of Airports In Kenya

Airports in Kenya
Wajir County
North Eastern Province (Kenya)
Transport in Kenya